Chinese Taipei competed at the 2022 World Aquatics Championships in Budapest, Hungary from 18 June to 3 July.

Diving

Chinese Taipei entered 1 diver.

Women

Open water swimming

Chinese Taipei entered 4 open water swimmers ( 2 men and 2 women)

Men

Women

 Mixed

Swimming

Chinese Taipei  entered 8 swimmers.
Men

Women

Mixed

References

Nations at the 2022 World Aquatics Championships
Chinese Taipei at the World Aquatics Championships
World Aquatics Championships